The Black Gold Derby is an American soccer rivalry between the two USL Championship (USLC) clubs based in Oklahoma: OKC Energy FC and FC Tulsa. The winner of the regular season series is awarded a four-foot wrench.

History
The Oklahoma City Energy formed in late 2013, and FC Tulsa, previously known as "Tulsa Roughnecks FC", formed in mid-2014. Both clubs began their series ahead of the 2015 USL season.

The Energy's formation came through local businessman, Bob Funk, Jr., who pursued a bid for a club in the USLC (then known as the United Soccer League) in early 2013. Funk was awarded a franchise on July 2, 2013 with an intended launch date in 2014. Ahead of the 2014 season the Energy FC announced an affiliation agreement with Major League Soccer side, Sporting Kansas City. Former Kansas City goalkeeper, Jimmy Nielsen, was named head coach.

In March 2014, OKC Pro Soccer owner and founder of Oklahoma City's Fields & Futures program Tim McLaughlin joined the club as an ownership partner, bringing a secured lease to Taft Stadium, where Energy FC began play in 2015. The club's 2014 home schedule was played at Pribil Stadium on the campus of Bishop McGuinness Catholic High School.

The origins of FC Tulsa date back to 1978, when the original Tulsa Roughnecks formed. The original Roughnecks formed as a relocation of Team Hawaii ahead of the 1978 North American Soccer League season. The original Roughnecks won Soccer Bowl '83 against the Toronto Blizzard. The second iteration of the Roughnecks came in 1993, which joined the United States Interregional Soccer League (USISL), the body that evolved into the operator of today's USLC, the United Soccer League. The best season results for this version of the Roughnecks came in 1993 and 1994 where they reached the divisional finals in the playoffs. The club folded following the 1999–2000 USISL I-League season.

The series is temporarily on hold as OKC Energy FC has announced a hiatus during the 2022 USL Championship season, planning to return to play by 2026.

Format
The trophy is awarded based on points earned for wins (3 points each) and draws (1 point each) during the USL Championship regular season and U.S. Open Cup fixtures, should the teams meet during the tournament.  In case of a tie in both points and goal differential, the team with the higher number of away goals scored will be the winner. Finally, in case of a tie on points, goal differential, and away goals, the trophy will be given to the team with the highest final placement in the USLC rankings.

Winners by year

Statistics

Results
Home team is listed on the left, away team is listed on the right. Home team's score is listed first.

References

External links
 Black Gold Derby

USL Championship
OKC Energy FC
FC Tulsa
2015 establishments in Oklahoma
Soccer in Oklahoma
Soccer rivalries in the United States